American indie-pop trio AJR has released four studio albums, two independent albums, five extended plays, twenty-nine singles, six promotional singles, and thirty-five music videos. The band released their fourth studio album, titled OK Orchestra, on March 26, 2021.

Studio albums

Independent albums

Extended plays

Singles

As lead artist

As featured artist

Promotional singles

Other charted songs

Music videos

Notes

References 

Discographies of American artists